Sara Modiano (January 11, 1951 – 2010) was a Colombian artist. Modiano's professional artistic career was made up of many styles of art that developed over the years. She is most known for her performance art and photographic series with elements of geometric shapes that overlap her self-portraits. Her art surrounds ideas on human identity, intense emotion, introspection, sexuality, and the feminine body. To honor her legacy, the Sara Modiano Foundation for the Arts was established and each year issues the Sara Modiano Grant, which is given based on financial need and artistic ability. Her work has been displayed in places such as the Hammer Museum, Brooklyn Museum, Caribbean Regional Artists Salon, and Museum of Latin American Art.

Biography 
Sara Modiano was born on January 11, 1951, in Barranquilla, Colombia, to Jacques Modiano and Eva Grunfeld. Modiano started off studying mathematics at the University of Los Andes in Bogotá, but soon transferred to the School of Fine Arts at Atlantic University in Barranquilla. Over the course of her career, she was in a multitude of group exhibitions, had nine solo exhibitions, and received five awards in her honor. Her artwork can be found anywhere from the Museum of Modern Art in Bogotá, Colombia to the Museum of Latin American Art in Long Beach, California. However, Modiano was not consistent in her form of art work from 1987 to 2001, having the human body be the muse for her work and a possible foreshadowing concerning her own body and health. In 2006, Modiano was diagnosed with ovarian cancer and died in 2010. The four years before her death were focused on performance art.

Contributions to feminist art 
All Modiano's works show great appreciation and representation of introspection and spirituality within herself leaving the viewer to think inward and reflect on their being. Beginning in the 1990s, Sara Modiano's style of work demonstrated a shift from installations, paintings, and sculpture to performance art and photography. This shift in style was pivotal in accentuating the new messages and interpretations Modiano was demonstrating. While continuing to express the theme of introspection, she began to place more focus on her sexuality, individuality, life, and ecstatic moments. Through this, Modiano shone a light on the female body and femininity through sexuality by making the audience question how they perceive the introspective, subliminal side of all women.

Inside Out from her Fragmented series shows a fragmented photograph zoomed into her face capturing the moment she reaches orgasm. Modiano used this moment of sexual arousal to represent the start of new life as well as a similarity all humans experience with one another: sexual pleasure. This feeling and illusion of fragmentation was a common technique Modiano used in many more of her photographic pieces. She integrated geometric shapes, such as cubes and squares, into photographs of herself to further solidify pinnacle moments, such as orgasms, as ethereal and intangible.

One of her last works was in 2007 titled Reflect. This photographic self-portrait series is slightly different from Inside Out and  because Modiano demonstrates herself in a new elevated way without the geometric illusion.  Her body is fully painted to make herself look metallic as she is in front of a plain blue background. The self-portraits come from a still of Modiano in motion as she expressed four heightened emotions: agony, pain, love, and ecstasy. Modiano shows her emotional, raw self yet again while calling to question our ideas and notions on how the viewer identifies themselves. She portrayed herself as almost an extraterrestrial being with the contrast of colors, while making the viewer reflect on how all humans have felt the emotions of pain, love, agony, and ecstasy before. Modiano described how this series made her feel about herself: "a woman with a big ego".

Performance art

"About Myself" At La Presencia Latin American Art in the United States at the MoIMA 
During the performance piece, Modiano used her body in a public space in efforts to change the perspective of people in the area. She was draped in a dress of wired cylinders as she wandered about the crowd using movements with her arms and hands to interact with the people surrounding her. Modiano's purpose for this piece was to physically demonstrate the intangible connection between art, view, and space by fueling herself with the reactions of the audience.

Legacy 
Sara Modiano had a professional art career of forty years where she made a clear demonstration of advanced conceptual and introspective ideas on humanity, emotions, and sexuality. A few years before she passed, her work was recognized and praised by the director of the IKF (International Kids Fund) Latin American Art Auction by having her work chosen for the event on many occasions. She will always be recognized as an important and active artist who was part of the Branquilla movement from the 1980s as well as a staple of Colombian art heritage. Her work continues to be displayed at the Museum of Modern Art in Bogotá (MoMAB) over ten years since her passing.

The Sara Modiano Foundation for the Arts: Sara Modiano Grant 
Sara Modiano's life is recognized and honored every year, since 2013, through the Sara Modiao Grant granted by the Sara Modiano Foundation for the Arts to young Latin American artists in Colombia. Through the course of Modiano's career, she believed in making art accessible to everyone and anyone, and through this foundation created by her children, her staple in the art world will be passed down for generations.

Artwork 
 Cube Project, 2004 
 , 1977
 , 1977
 , 1981
 Intimate, 2002
 Reflect, 2007

Solo exhibitions 
 1974: Barrios Gallery, Barranquilla, Colombia
 1975: Belarca Gallery, Bogotá, Colombia
 1979: Centro Colombo Americano, Barranquilla, Colombia
 1979: Galeria de la Oficina, Medellín, Colombia
 1982: Quintero Gallery, Barranquilla, Colombia
 2003: La Resistencia de L’Art, Mallorca, Spain
 2003: CUBE I: Multi Media Art Experience Art Loves Design, Art Basel, Miami Beach, Florida
 2004: Featured Artist, Art Miami 2004, Miami Beach Convention Center, Miami, Florida
 2004: CUBE II: Multi Media Art Experience Art Loves Design, Art Basel, Miami Beach, Florida

References 

1951 births
2010 deaths
20th-century Colombian women artists
21st-century Colombian women artists
People from Barranquilla
University of Los Andes (Colombia) alumni

Premi d’ Arts Plastiques
Museo de Arte La Tertulia